Bagra Tawa railway station is a railway station in Narmadapuram district, Madhya Pradesh. Its code is BGTA. It serves Bagra Tawa village. The station consists of two platforms serviced by passenger and express trains.

References

Railway stations in Narmadapuram district
Jabalpur railway division